The legend of Slovene and Ruse and the city of Slovensk is a late chronicle legend of the XVII century about the settlement of Novgorod’s surroundings by the tribe of Slovenes, about the story of Rurik and epic ancestors of the Russian people.

History of creation
Up to now, more than 100 lists of "The Legends ..." (with variations in titles), dated mainly in the second half of the XVII century, have been preserved, including the Annals of Patriarch Nikon of 1652–1658, in the “Chronograph” of 1679, in the Novgorod III Chronicle, in the Mazurinsky Chronicle of Isidor Snazin, Novgorod Zabelinska and Pogodinsky annals. Modern publications are often based on the list of the "Chronograph", 1679.

Historians A. Lavrentev and E. S. Galkina suggest that "The Legends ..." was compiled by the founder of the Siberian chronicle metropolitan Cyprian (1626-1634), although the versions about the migrational movements of Slovene and Rus, their relationships are known long until the XVII century. Thus, Arab-Persian authors from the XII century cited tales of Rus and Slavs with mention of the eponyms Rus and Slav, sometimes medieval authors retrospectively linked the Rus to earlier events up to the XIV century. From the XIV century in the West Slavic epic there are figures of Czech, Lekh and Rus (Mech), the Byzantine author Simeon Logofet mentions Rus as the ancestor of the Russian people in the X century.

The content of "The Legends ..."
"The Legends ..." recalls ethnogenetic legends from the times of Herodotus and Diodorus of Sicily about the origin of Scythia people. The ancestors of the Russian people are named to be knyazh of Slovene and Rus - the descendants of Knyazh Skif. According to this "legend", in 3099 dating from the creation of the world (2409 BC), Slovene and Rus with their families began leaving their lands in search of new ones, from the shores of the Black Sea and after 14 years they came to the Lake Moisko (Ilmen), where Slovene established the city of Slovensk (modern Veliky Novgorod), and Rusa - the city of Rus (modern Old Russa).

"The Legend ..." in the traditional eugmeric key for medieval bookness gives explanations for hydronyms and place names in the Novgorod region from the names of the relatives of Slovene and Rus, mentions the resettlement of the Slavs at that time to the White Sea and the Urals, military campaigns against Egypt, Greece and other "barbarian" countries.

Next, we tell you about various episodes of the history of Slavs, in particular, the negotiations of the Russian princes with Alexander the Great, the visit of Russia to the Apostle Andrew, wars with the ugras and Bulgarians, the reign of Knyazh Gostomysla and the calling of the Varangians. "The Legend ..." repeats the popular legend of the origin of Rurik from the Roman Emperor Augustus. At the same time, the legend says that he was invited to rule the Russian land from the territory of Prussia.

Usage of "The Legends ..."

The legend was widely spread in the Moscow state in the XVII-XVIII centuries, its retelling or similar information is contained in the Ioakimovskaya Chronicle, the works of P. N. Krekshin, M. V. Lomonosov, V. N. Tatishchev and others. Partly, the legend "Chronicle, telling the deeds from the beginning of the world of being until the Nativity of Christ" Dmitry Rostovsky is used and attributed to Feofan Prokopovich "Detailed Chronicle from the Beginning of Russia to the Poltava Battalion".  Historians as N.M. Karamzin, N.I. Kostomarov and other domestic historians did not pass by comments to the legend.

The plot of "The Legends ..." was played in the tale of V.A. Lyovshin "The Story of the Bogatyr" (1780-1783).

Today, a number of non-academic authors (A.I. Asov, V.N. Demin, etc.) defend the viewpoint that the epic is based on reliable facts - the directions of the movements of some Indo-Europeans as the immediate ancestors of the Slovaks and Ruses, approximate time of their arrival to Moisko (Ilmen), probable participation in a number of vivid historical events. Their conclusions are not recognized by academic science.

Non-academic is the "ancient Legend", and not the approximate time of resettlement of a significant part of the ancestors of Eastern Europe’s population (haplogroup R-Z280).

References

Sources
 
 
 

Russian folklore characters
Russian knights
Epics
Russian folklore